The 1971 Austrian Grand Prix was a Formula One motor race held at Österreichring on 15 August 1971. It was race 8 of 11 in both the 1971 World Championship of Drivers and the 1971 International Cup for Formula One Manufacturers. The 54-lap race was won by BRM driver Jo Siffert after he started from pole position. Emerson Fittipaldi finished second for the Lotus team and Brabham driver Tim Schenken came in third. This was the debut race of the future world champion Niki Lauda.

Race report 

Jo Siffert took a surprise pole position from Jackie Stewart and led away at the start from Clay Regazzoni and Jacky Ickx. The front two drew away from the pack, where Regazzoni was duelling with François Cevert and Ickx was dropping back with mechanical problems. On lap 21, Stewart with a poorly handling car allowed Cevert through so he could chase Siffert. Further down the field, there were two Brabham-Lotus battles,  with Tim Schenken duelling with Emerson Fittipaldi and Reine Wisell trading places with Graham Hill. By lap 32, Ickx had retired with a spark plug problem, Regazzoni had an engine blow up and Fittipaldi had passed Schenken and set about catching Stewart.

On lap 36, Stewart's race ended with a violent accident - his left rear driveshaft broke and the wheel was torn off. He emerged unhurt to be greeted as World Champion following Ickx's retirement. Cevert was chasing down Siffert, but with 12 laps to go his gearbox exploded.

Fittipaldi was now carving chunks out the BRM's lead, due to a left-rear puncture for the Swiss. However he managed to nurse the ailing car home for a popular victory by 4 seconds. Schenken was 3rd, with Wisell pipping Hill for 4th place - the Englishman was another to suffer a puncture in the dying stages and Henri Pescarolo finished 6th in his March. Stewart won the Drivers' Championship with 3 races left to go.

Classification

Qualifying

Race

Championship standings after the race

Drivers' Championship standings

Constructors' Championship standings

Note: Only the top five positions are included for both sets of standings.

References

Austrian Grand Prix
Grand Prix
Austrian Grand Prix